The Symphony Sessions is the twenty-first studio album released by The Manhattan Transfer on October 3, 2006.

Track listing

Personnel 

The Manhattan Transfer
 Cheryl Bentyne – vocals, vocal arrangements (11)
 Tim Hauser – vocals, vocal arrangements (4)
 Alan Paul – vocals, vocal arrangements (6, 10)
 Janis Siegel – vocals, vocal arrangements (2, 6, 12)

Musicians and Arrangements
 Yaron Gervoshsky – grand piano, musical director, orchestral arrangements (6), orchestra director (6, 12)
 John B. Williams – bass
 Steve Hass – drums
 David Glasser – saxophone 
 Scott Kreitzer – saxophone
 Cliff Lyons – saxophone
 Roger Rosenberg – saxophone
 Andy Snitzer – saxophone
 Randy Andos – trombone 
 Michael Boschen – trombone
 Birch Johnson – trombone
 Jimmy Hynes – trumpet 
 Robert Millikan – trumpet
 Dave Stahl – trumpet
 Scott Wendholt – trumpet
 Prague Symphony Orchestra – orchestra 
 Corey Allen – orchestra director (1-5, 7-12), orchestral arrangements (3, 5, 7, 9, 10, 11)
 Billy Byers – orchestral arrangements (1, 2)
 Charles Calello – orchestral arrangements (4)
 Gil Goldstein – orchestral arrangements (8)
 Joe Roccisano – orchestral arrangements (12)
 Al Capps – vocal arrangements (1)
 Fred Thaler – vocal arrangements (2)
 Gene Puerling – vocal arrangements (3, 5, 9)
 Dick Reynolds – vocal arrangements (7)
 Roger Treece – vocal arrangements (8)
 Ian Prince – vocal arrangements (11)

Production 
 Tim Hauser – producer, mastering
 Corey Allen – orchestra producer (1-5, 7-12)
 Yaron Gervoshsky – orchestra producer (6, 12)
 Susumu Morikawa – executive producer 
 Manfred Knoop – tracking engineer
 Hans Nielsen – orchestra engineer 
 Michael Eric Hutchinson – vocal engineer, mixing, mastering
 Tom McCauley – additional engineer 
 Tom Swift – additional engineer 
 Takekazu Honda – A&R
 Lenka Dudova – assistant administration 
 Juraj Durovic – orchestra management 
 Kiyoshi Osada – artwork 
 Junichi Yamashita – artwork coordinator 
 Joan Allen – photography
 Michael Davenport – manager
 Juraj Durovic – orchestra manager
 Merlin Company – management company

Studios
 Recorded at Knoop Music (River Edge, New Jersey); Big Surprise Music (Encino, California); Smecky Music Studios (Czech Republic).

References

External links
 The Manhattan Transfer Official Website

The Manhattan Transfer albums
2006 albums